"Hug My Soul" is a song by British band Saint Etienne. It was written by vocalist Sarah Cracknell along with songwriting partners Guy Batson and Johnny Male (Male and Batson would help co-write a number of tracks on Cracknell's solo debut Lipslide).

The single was released with three B-sides: two written by Saint Etienne's songwriting partnership of Bob Stanley and Pete Wiggs, "I Buy American Records" and "Hate Your Drug", and a cover version of La Poupée Qui Fait Non (No, No, No)", a live recording produced by the band's friend (and future Heavenly label mate) Edwyn Collins. A second CD featured remixes by Motiv8, Secret Knowledge, Juan "Kinky" Hernandez and Sure Is Pure. It reached number 32 on the UK Singles Chart and was their first single not to be released on 7-inch vinyl.

This would be Saint Etienne's final release for Warner Bros. Follow up single "He's on the Phone" would be released on MCA Records, lifted from a dance compilation album called Life is a Dance. The US releases included a number of exclusive remixes - including an alternate album version (which was released as a bonus track on the US version of Tiger Bay), a Motiv-8 dub, and the On Tour In '94 dub.

The song bears a resemblance to the 70s disco hit More, More, More by Andrea True Connection. In particular, the phrasing of the "More More More" lyric "Ooh, how do you like your love?" is identical to the "Hug My Soul" lyric "Ooh, what are you dreaming of?", and both lyrics are the opening to each of their representative songs.

Marketing
The UK release featured cover art involving a photograph of abandoned musical instruments. The US release features a photograph of the band.

Critical reception
Tim Sendra from AllMusic described the song as "lush and sophisticated dance-pop". Larry Flick from Billboard commented, "Songs like "Hug My Soul" combine a familiar blend of airy modern pop with prominent dance beats and fairly aggressive execution." In his weekly UK chart commentary, James Masterton said that Sarah Cracknell and the lads "return with what is probably not the most straightforward single they have ever released, moving away from the pretty pop tunes they have produced of late and going back to their ambient dub roots and the sort of sound that dominates their albums. No major surprises then and no large hits - for now." Pan-European magazine Music & Media wrote, "Despite the six mixes to draw the attention of the dance-minded, it will always be a pop song. If you don't think you're ready, check out the lovely track "I Buy American Records"." James Hamilton from Music Week'''s RM Dance Update viewed it as a "strings sawed breathy sweet shuffler". Neil Spencer from The Observer called it a "chart contender" and "disco slick". Tony Cross from Smash Hits declared it as a "piece of pop perfection".

Music video
The single was marketed with a surreal music video inspired by the 1975 French film La Bête. It was directed by British journalist, author, comedian and punk poet Steven Wells. The video involved what was, according to Wells, a “frighteningly realistic bear suit”. Werner Herzog later ripped this idea off for Grizzly Man. In the video, Sarah Cracknell plays a young girl asleep with her stuffed toys; she dreams of being chased by a bear, but ultimately ends up having jelly and ice cream with him in his den, attired in a sultry black dress that had featured in the 1971 James Bond film Diamonds are Forever, on which her father Derek Cracknell had served as a second unit director. "We had a meeting to discuss locations and so on, and it was decided that I'd wear a dress of my mum's that had been worn by Jill St. John in Diamonds Are Forever''," Cracknell recounted, "but that's another story." "Hug My Soul" was published on YouTube in May 2012.

Track listing
All tracks were written and composed by Batson, Cracknell, Male; except where indicated.

 Tracks 1,2 remixed by Sure Is Pure
 Tracks 3,4 remixed by Kris Needs

Charts

References

Saint Etienne (band) songs
1994 singles
1994 songs
Ambient songs
Dub songs
Heavenly Recordings singles
Songs written by Sarah Cracknell